Mowla Qoli (also Romanized as Mowlā Qolī; also known as Mowlāābād) is a village in Vardasht Rural District, in the Central District of Semirom County, Isfahan Province, Iran. At the 2006 census, its population was 70, in 16 families.

References 

Populated places in Semirom County